One More American is a 1918 American silent drama film directed by William C. deMille and written by Olga Printzlau and William C. deMille. The film stars George Beban, Marcia Manon, Mae Giraci, Helen Jerome Eddy, Raymond Hatton, and Jack Holt. The film was released on February 25, 1918, by Paramount Pictures. It is not known whether the film currently survives, which suggests that it is a lost film.

Plot
As described in a film magazine, after five years separation Luigi Riccardo (Beban) learns that his wife Maria (Manon) and daughter Tessa (Giraci) are going to join him in America. Although legally not a citizen, in his heart Luigi regards his adopted country with reverence and his refusal to pay graft to Boss Regan (Carpenter) results in his wife and daughter being held at Ellis Island upon their arrival. Through the assistance of some detectives from the district attorney's office, the Regan scheme is exposed and Luigi's wife and daughter are permitted to enter the country and join him.

Cast
George Beban as Luigi Riccardo
Marcia Manon as Maria Riccardo (credited as Camille Ankewich)
Mae Giraci as Tessa Riccardo
Helen Jerome Eddy as Lucia
Raymond Hatton as Bump Rundle
Jack Holt as Sam Potts
Horace B. Carpenter as Mike Regan
Hector Dion as Dr. Ross
May Palmer as Mrs. Ross
Ernest Joy as Mr. Fearing
Pietro Buzzi as Piano Player (credited as Signor Buzzi)

References

External links 
 

1918 films
1910s English-language films
Silent American drama films
1918 drama films
Paramount Pictures films
Films directed by William C. deMille
American black-and-white films
American silent feature films
1910s American films